The Greater Brighton City Region is an area in the south of England centred on Brighton, incorporating seven local government districts in East Sussex and West Sussex. The Greater Brighton Economic Board was created in April 2014 to oversee a 6-year programme of development and investment within the area, which as of as of 2021 has about one million people.

Economic Board membership
The City Region was initially formed from five local authorities (Brighton and Hove, Mid Sussex, Worthing, Lewes and the Adur district), together with the South Downs National Park, the University of Sussex, the University of Brighton and the Greater Brighton Metropolitan College. The City Region was subsequently extended to include Crawley and Gatwick Airport on 6 February 2018 and Arun in 2019. The Chair of the Board is elected from amongst the local authority representatives on an annual basis, the current Chair of the Board is Cllr Phélim Mac Cafferty.

Colour key (for political parties):

Economy
In 2019 the city region was seen to support over 500,000 jobs and had a net worth of £23 billion. Creative industries worth more than £1.5 billion in the city region, with Brighton and Hove and Crawley boroughs being particular key areas. In its first six years of running the Economic Board was reported to have attracted £160 million of investment to the city region.

Demographics

References

External links
Greater Brighton City Region

Brighton
Metropolitan areas of England